This chronological list of managers of East Stirlingshire Football Club comprises all those who have held the position of manager of the first team of East Stirlingshire F.C. since the position was created in 1966. The club's first ever manager was Lawrence Binnie in 1966, prior to then all management roles were assigned to the board of directors at the club. Sir Alex Ferguson's first ever managerial job was with East Stirlingshire. He managed the club during 1974 before moving to St Mirren. No manager has ever won a league title with the club, however, Billy Lamont managed the club to a runners-up spot in the 1979–80 Scottish Second Division. To date, every person to have managed the club has been from Scotland.

Managers

References

Managers
 
East Stirlingshire
Managers